The SS Thomas T. Tucker (Hull Number 269) was a Liberty ship built by The Houston Shipbuilding Corporation for service as a troop and weapons carrier.

Liberty ships were named after prominent (deceased) Americans, starting with Patrick Henry and the signers of the Declaration of Independence. She was named after Thomas Tudor Tucker, an American physician and politician from Charleston, South Carolina. He represented South Carolina in both the Continental Congress and the U.S. House. He later served as Treasurer of the United States.

Career 
The ship was laid down on June 16, 1942, then launched on August 31, 1942. She was operated by Merchants & Miners Transportation Company under  charter with the Maritime Commission and War Shipping Administration. She ran aground off Olifantsbos Point, near Cape Point, on November 27, 1942, during heavy fog while on her maiden voyage from New Orleans to Suez. She was sailing close to the coast – as she usually did when the sea was rough, due to the German U-boats actively patrolling the area – and the captain misjudged the ship's location because of the heavy fog. Assuming they were close to Robben Island, and therefore not far from Cape Town, the crew relaxed, and the ship ran aground. After an investigation, it was discovered that the ship's compass was out by 37°, although no conclusive reason was found for the incident.

Location 
The wreck is located on stretch of rocks on the shoreline of Olifantsbos Beach, within The Cape of Good Hope Nature Reserve. It is split into three sections with a boiler higher up on the beach.

See also
 List of shipwrecks of the Western Cape.

References

External links

Shipwrecks of the South African Atlantic coast
Liberty ships
Maritime incidents in November 1942
1942 ships